Zugarramurdi is a town and municipality located in the province and autonomous community of Navarre in northern Spain. It passed into history as the setting of alleged occult activity featured in the infamous Basque witch trials held in Logroño in the seventeenth century. The town is home to the Basque witch museum and the Witch Caves. Every year, spectacular fires are lit in the caves near Zugarramurdi for the celebration of the ‘day of the witch’ on the summer solstice.

Etymology
Zugarramurdi is a toponym with unknown meaning, even though it comes from Basque. The philologist Koldo Mitxelena proposed that the etymology of the name could be “place with abundancy of ruined elms”, coming from zugar (elm) + andur (ruined) + the suffix –di (it indicates abundancy). However, Mitxelena himself admitted not having proof about this theory.
In Basque and in Spanish it seems that the name of the village is transcribed in the same way, although the z is pronounced differently in both languages. Because of that, the pronunciation slightly varies.

Legend

It is said that the word “akelarre” comes from the field next to one of the small Zugarramurdi caves, where the witch meetings used to take place. The Basque word akelarre means “the field of the he-goat”, as well as 'witches sabbath'. Those present in the meetings used to call the caves from this field, because in it, a big black he-goat used to graze (called Akerbeltz in Basque). It is said the he-goat turned into a human when the witches gathered, so it is thought the goat was the devil itself. This is why Zugarramurdi is often called “The Cathedral of the Devil”.

The legend of Zugartamurdi is the main plot of the 2013 Spanish film, La brujas de Zugarramurdi (in English, it is Witching and Bitching).

Gallery

References

External links
 Homepage of Zugarramurdi
 ZUGARRAMURDI in the Bernardo Estornés Lasa - Auñamendi Encyclopedia (Euskomedia Fundazioa) 

Municipalities in Navarre